The 1921 Milan–San Remo was the 14th edition of the Milan–San Remo cycle race and was held on 3 April 1921. The race started in Milan and finished in San Remo. The race was won by Costante Girardengo.

General classification

References

1921
1921 in road cycling
1921 in Italian sport
April 1921 sports events